Arts Trek is an annual cultural festival in Shawnee, Oklahoma, United States, in mid-spring. It is an event by the Mabee-Gerrer Museum of Art and is located on the campus of St. Gregory's University. The one-day festival features a performance walk, in which visitors move around campus in an organized trek to view fine arts performances such as choirs, spoken word art, theatre production scenes, interpretive dance, and live mural painting. 

In 2012, Arts Trek was awarded "Outstanding Event" by the Central Oklahoma Frontier Country Marketing Association. The festival received the award again in 2014.

References

  

Tourist attractions in Pottawatomie County, Oklahoma
Festivals in Oklahoma
St. Gregory's University